Nikolai Nikolayevich Obruchev (1830–1904) was a General Staff Officer in the Imperial Russian Army, imperial Russian general staff officer, military statistician, planner and chief of the Main Staff.

Biography

Obruchev was born in Warsaw in a military family. He entered the First Cadet Corps and went on to the Nicholas Military Academy in 1848. In 1858, he founded Voyenny Sbornik (Military Collection) as a professional military journal. However after printing articles critical of Russian military logistics in the Crimea War, he was removed from the position. However he became a protégé of Dmitry Milyutin who in 1863 appointed him secretary of the Military Academic Committee of the Main Staff. From this position he helped ensure Miliutin's military reforms were put into effect.

He played a key role in preparing for the Russo-Turkish War of 1877 - 1878. In July 1877 he was posted to the Caucasus front where he successfully planned the defeat of the Turkish Army. Then he was moved to the Balkan front where his plan for winter operations helped lead to the capitulation of the Ottoman Empire

In 1881 Pyotr Vannovskiy, the new Minister of War appointed him chief of the Main Staff. Obruchev now played a role in rearming the Russian Army, constructing fortifications on the western military frontier and laying plans for amphibious operation across the Bosphorus. At this time he proposed reorganising the Main Staff into five directorates: First and Second Quartermaster Generals, Adjutant General, Military Communications and Military Topography. However this structure was not implemented until 1903.

He attended the Franco-Russian Military Convention of 1892 and persuaded Nicholas II not to intervene in the Sino-Japanese War of 1894 - 1895.
 
Retired from active service in 1897, Obruchev died in France in June 1904.

References
 The Fateful Alliance by George F. Kennan, (1984),  New York: Pantheon.
 The Tsar's Colonels: Professionalism, Strategy, and Subversion in Late Imperial Russia by David Alan Rich (1998),Cambridge, MA, Harvard University Press.

1830 births
1904 deaths
Burials at Nikolskoe Cemetery
Imperial Russian Army generals
Honorary members of the Saint Petersburg Academy of Sciences
Recipients of the Order of St. George of the Third Degree
Recipients of the Order of the Cross of Takovo
Russian nihilists